Michael Schermick (born October 21, 1958), known professionally as Michael Kelly Smith, is an American guitarist who played for the glam metal bands Cinderella and Britny Fox. Schermick and drummer Tony Destra were fired from Cinderella in 1985 at the request of the record label, Polygram.

Following his departure from Cinderella, he joined up with Tony Destra, Dean Davidson, Billy Childs and Johnny Dee to form Britny Fox and became their lead guitarist. Schermick played on every album released by Britny Fox until their breakup in 1992.

Prior to Cinderella and Britny Fox, Michael had been a guitarist in the bands Atlantic Star, Telepath, Psychopath, Diamonds, Saints in Hell and The Priscella Harriet Band.

He also played in a band known as Razamanaz featuring Cory Massi on lead vocals and guitar, Joe Bisbing on bass, and Steve Attig on drums.

He currently teaches guitar in Horsham, Pennsylvania.

Discography

With Cinderella
 "Shake Me"/"Nobody's Fool" (7") 1983.
 Demos

With Britny Fox
 Britny Fox (1988)
 Boys In Heat (1989)
 Bite Down Hard (1991)
 Springhead Motorshark (2003)

With Razamanaz
 Razamanaz (2003)

References

1958 births
20th-century American guitarists
Living people
Britny Fox members
Cinderella (band) members
Guitarists from Pennsylvania